Sébastien Charlier (born 22 February 1975, Beaumont-sur-Oise) is a French diatonic harmonica player. He plays chromatically, in all keys, on a single blues harp. His music is inspired by many different influences, from blues to jazz, from fusion to electro-pop. He has also written two textbooks: Je débute l'harmonica and Méthode en poche harmonica.

Discography 
Solo
 Impasse des Mousserons, 1995, Electro Jazz
 Just Jazz, 1998, 9 jazz standards
 Diatonic Revelation, 2005, produced by Didier Lockwood
 Precious Time, 2009, Jazz Fusion
 La Coccinelle Geante, 2009, Electro-Pop
 Precious Time 2.0, 2016, Jazz Fusion
Collaborations:
 Six ½ - Six ½, chante Nougaro
 Jean-Paul Millier - Jazz par Millier
Pop / Rock / Electro:
 Karim Kacel - Une autre
 Laetitia Backwell – Changer d’univers
 Compilation  – Tribute to Lee Brilleaux
 DVD Laurent Gatz – Gatz Band Live @ New Morning
 Too Much Processing - J'aime Ta Soeur
On soundtracks
 John Scott - Concerts pour l'Aventure
 Armand Amar, La jeune fille et les loups
 Patrice Peyriéras - Une famille pas comme les autres
 Thierry Malet – L'Héritier

Video
 Harmo Jazz

References

External links
 Official site
 Chorus video
 Precious Time video

1971 births
Living people
People from Beaumont-sur-Oise
Rock harmonica players
French musicians